The Arrondissement of Menen was a short-lived arrondissement in the present-day Province of West Flanders, Belgium. It was created in 1818 and it already ceased to exist in 1823.

Menen